Scutiger bhutanensis is a species of frog in the family Megophryidae. It is endemic to Bhutan. Its natural habitat is rivers.

References

bhutanensis
Endemic fauna of Bhutan
Amphibians of Bhutan
Taxonomy articles created by Polbot
Amphibians described in 2001